New London Ledge Lighthouse is a lighthouse on the Thames River in Connecticut at the mouth of New London harbor. It was built in 1909 in the Second Empire style and was automated in 1987.  In 1990 it was added to the National Register of Historic Places. The lighthouse is owned and maintained by the New London Maritime Society as part of the  National Historic Lighthouse Preservation Act program.

History
New London Ledge Lighthouse was built in 1909 on the southwest ledge. It was originally called the Southwest Ledge light, but this caused confusion with Southwest Ledge Light in New Haven, Connecticut, so it was renamed New London Ledge Light in 1910. The United States Coast Guard took over in 1939 upon its merger with the Lighthouse Service and the light was automated in 1987. The original fourth order Fresnel lens was removed and was later put on display in the Custom House Maritime Museum. The light was added to the National Register of Historic Places in 1990.

Ghost legend
New London Ledge is locally famous for the ghost of an early keeper named Ernie who allegedly haunts the lighthouse. The Coast Guard crew on duty at the lighthouse reported unexplained knockings taking place at night, as well as doors opening and closing repeatedly, the television turning on and off by itself sporadically, and the unexplained removal of sheets from beds.

William Grace, the last Coast Guard officer to man the lighthouse, wrote the following in the crew's log on the last night before the automated light system was installed: "Rock of slow torture. Ernie's domain. Hell on earth—may New London Ledge’s light shine on forever because I’m through. I will watch it from afar while drinking a brew."

Ledge Light has been featured on paranormal reality shows such as Scariest Places on Earth and Ghost Hunters. Investigators from The Atlantic Paranormal Society concluded on Ghost Hunters that there was not enough evidence to determine any paranormal activity taking place at the lighthouse, despite a few unexplained phenomena such as cold spots.

Head keepers
 W.B. Petty (1909 – 1910)
 George E. Hansen (1910 – at least 1917)
 Howard B. Beebe (1926 – 1938)
 Leonard Fuller (at least 1940)
 Michael Scanlan (1943 – 1949)
 William Clark (1954 – 1959)

See also

 List of lighthouses in Connecticut
 List of lighthouses in the United States
National Register of Historic Places listings in New London County, Connecticut

References
Notes

Bibliography

External links

Long Island Sound
Lighthouses on the National Register of Historic Places in Connecticut
Lighthouses in New London County, Connecticut
Reportedly haunted locations in Connecticut
Lighthouses completed in 1909
Buildings and structures in Groton, Connecticut
Historic American Engineering Record in Connecticut
National Register of Historic Places in New London County, Connecticut